The Church of St Editha is an Anglican parish church and Grade I listed building in Tamworth, Staffordshire, England.

History

The church of St. Editha is the largest parish church in Staffordshire. Most of the church is mid- to late-14th-century and 15th-century work with some 19th-century additions.

The present building stands upon the ground where successive churches have stood since the eighth century. The first church was destroyed, along with the town, by the Danes in 874 and it was not until the time of Æthelflæd that a second church arose. The Danes ruined this church in 943 and it was King Edgar who re-founded it around 963. Editha was probably King Edgar's aunt who died in the 960s and was canonized shortly after for her life of devotion and piety and then made the Patron Saint of the now collegiate church.

In 1345 the town and church were destroyed by fire and so began a rebuilding, being the fourth (present) church. Begun in 1350 and completed in 1369, this edifice is a monument to the man whose task it became to rebuild and enlarge the church, Dean Baldwin de Witney.

The College of Canons of St. Editha was probably a royal foundation in the 10th century, although the date of foundation is unknown. Although the right to appoint Canons was disputed, by the 12th century, all appointments were Royal. There were a Dean and six prebendaries.

The college was dissolved in 1548 under the terms of the Dissolution of Colleges Act 1547 and the church became the parish church for the town of Tamworth.

Samuel Parkes (c.1815–1864) was baptised here on 24 December 1815. He won the Victoria Cross in the Charge of the Light Brigade for saving the life of Trumpeter Hugh Crawford. His parents Thomas Park(e)s and Lydia Fearn are buried in the churchyard and commemorated by a tombstone.

The church was extensively restored by Benjamin Ferrey and George Gilbert Scott in the 1850s, and William Butterfield, ca. 1871. There is a rare example of a double spiral staircase in the tower, the only others being in the Château de Chambord, France and All Saints Church, Pontefract.

Deans of Tamworth

Stained glass

There are medieval fragments in the vestry east window. The chancel east window dates from 1870, by William Wailes.

There are south clerestory windows of 1873, by Ford Madox Brown for Morris & Co. The chapel east window of 1874 is by Edward Burne-Jones also for Morris & Co.

Organ

The church has an historic pipe organ dating from 1766. The first instrument was installed by Nathaniel Dudley. Samuel Green built a new organ in 1792, taking the Dudley organ to Isleworth in South West London. Alexander Buckingham added a chair/choir division in 1809 and a pedal division was added by William Hill in 1841. Further work was carried out by George Holdich, Brycesons Bros and finally Nicholsons of Worcester. A new organ was built in 1927 by Harrison and Harrison incorporating much of the old pipework and is expected to be restored in 2009/2010. A specification from 1929 can be found on the National Pipe Organ Register.

Organists

John Alcock 1766 – 1790
William Birch 1790 – 1815
John Valentine 1815 – 1816
Thomas Valentine 1816 – 1818
John Twelch Greaves 1818 – 1828
John Hewitt 1828 – 1829
James J. Greaves 1829 – 1832
John Twelch Greaves 1832 – 1867
T. H. Reade 1867 – 1868
J. Smith Creswell 1868 – 1874
George Herbert Gregory 1874 – 1876 (afterwards organist of St Botolph's Church, Boston
William Edward Wadely 1876 – 1877
R. Matthews 1877 – 1886
Henry Rose 1886 – 1950
W. Darling 1950 – 1965
W. H. Hughes 1965 – 1972
Kenneth Edwards 1973 –

In 1929, Henry Rose appointed the then 13-year-old Ernest Titterton as assistant organist. Titterton later went on to help develop the atomic bomb.

See also

 Saint Editha
 Dissolution of the Monasteries
 Grade I listed buildings in Staffordshire
 Grade I listed churches in Staffordshire
 Listed buildings in Tamworth, Staffordshire

References

External links
 St Editha's homepage

Former collegiate churches in England
Grade I listed churches in Staffordshire
Tamworth
Double spiral staircases
Buildings and structures in Tamworth, Staffordshire